Kawlin District is a district in Sagaing Region, Myanmar. On 5 December 2018, three townships in Katha District were separated and formed as Kawlin District. The principal town is Kawlin.

Townships

Kawlin District consists of the following three townships.
Kawlin Township
Wuntho Township
Pinlebu Township

References

Sagaing Region